Alexander 'Álex' Vallejo Mínguez (born 16 January 1992) is a Spanish professional footballer who plays as a midfielder for Ekstraklasa side Stal Mielec. He has previously played for Spanish clubs Alavés, Sestao, Mallorca, Córdoba and Fuenlabrada, before moving to England in 2020, and Cyprus in 2022.

Football career
Born in Vitoria-Gasteiz, Álava, Vallejo finished his graduation with Deportivo Alavés' youth setup, and made his senior debut with the club's reserves in the 2011–12 season, in the Tercera División. On 20 August 2011, he made his first-team debut, but was substituted after 24 minutes after conceding a penalty in a 2–2 away draw against CA Osasuna B, in the Segunda División B championship.

On 25 January 2012, Vallejo signed a new deal with Alavés and was immediately loaned to Sestao River Club, also in the third division. On 2 August, he joined fellow third-division side RCD Mallorca B and was a regular starter in the 2012–13 season, in which the club were relegated.

On 23 November 2013, Vallejo played his first professional game with the club's first team, starting in a 2–1 home win over former club Alavés, in the Segunda División. On 26 June of the following year, he renewed his association with the Balearic outfit for three years, being definitively promoted to the first-team.

On 20 December 2014, Vallejo scored his first professional goal in a 3–1 away loss to SD Ponferradina; this match proved to be his last one with the main squad before suffering a severe knee injury in April 2015, sidelining him for nearly two years.

On 2 July 2017, after suffering relegation from the Segunda División, free agent Vallejo signed a two-year contract with fellow second-tier team Córdoba CF. On 5 August 2019, after another relegation, he signed a one-year deal with second division newcomers CF Fuenlabrada.

On 31 January 2020, after appearing sparingly, Vallejo cut ties with Fuenla.

On 18 October 2020, Vallejo joined EFL Championship side Huddersfield Town as a free agent on a contract running until the end of the 2020–21 season with Huddersfield having the option of a further year’s extension. After a period of adapting to manager Carlos Corberán’s physical demands, he made 16 appearances for the club in the 2020–21 campaign. Huddersfield activated the one year option for the 2021–22 season. He scored his first goal for Huddersfield against Blackburn Rovers on 28 September 2021.  Huddersfield announced on 1 June 2022 that he had been released.

After a short stint with Cypriot side Doxa Katokopias, on 26 January 2023 Vallejo signed a six-month deal with Polish Ekstraklasa side Stal Mielec, with a two-year extension option.

Career statistics

References

External links

1992 births
Living people
Spanish footballers
Footballers from the Basque Country (autonomous community)
Association football midfielders
Segunda División players
Segunda División B players
Tercera División players
English Football League players
Cypriot First Division players

Deportivo Alavés B players
Deportivo Alavés players
Sestao River footballers
RCD Mallorca B players
RCD Mallorca players
Córdoba CF players
CF Fuenlabrada footballers
Huddersfield Town A.F.C. players
Doxa Katokopias FC players
Stal Mielec players
Spanish expatriate footballers
Expatriate footballers in England
Spanish expatriate sportspeople in the United Kingdom
Expatriate footballers in Cyprus
Spanish expatriate sportspeople in Cyprus
Expatriate footballers in Poland
Spanish expatriate sportspeople in Poland